The Perfect Crime is the second studio album by English punk rock band Anti-Nowhere League. The sound of the band changed a great deal from their debut album, We Are...The League. The Perfect Crime features a blend of 1980s rock with a light punk sound.  It was the last studio album by the band before they broke up for several years.

Track listing
All songs written by Animal/Magoo.
"Crime"
"Atomic Harvest"
"On the Waterfront"
"Branded"
"(I Don't Believe) This Is My England"
"Johannesburg"
"The Shining"
"Working for the Company"
"System"
"The Curtain"

Personnel
Animal − vocals
Magoo − rhythm guitar
Gilly (Mark Gilham) − lead guitar
Winston Blake − bass
JB − drums

References

Anti-Nowhere League albums
1987 albums